Mt. Royal/MICA station, often referred to interchangeably as University of Baltimore / Mount Royal station, (formerly Mount Royal ststion) is a Baltimore Light Rail station in Baltimore, Maryland. It is on the northwest edge of the University of Baltimore campus and on the northern edge of the MICA campus, the site of Baltimore & Ohio Railroad's former Mount Royal Station. It opened in 1992 as part of the line's initial operating segment.

References

External links

 Station from Mt. Royal Avenue from Google Maps Street View

1992 establishments in Maryland
Baltimore Light Rail stations
Midtown, Baltimore
Railway stations in Maryland at university and college campuses
Railway stations in Baltimore
Railway stations in the United States opened in 1992